The 2000 USL A-League was an American Division II league run by the United Soccer League during the summer of 2000.

League standings

Eastern Conference

Northeast Division

Atlantic Division

Western Conference

Central Division

Pacific Division

Conference Quarterfinals

Eastern Conference

Western Conference

Conference semifinals

Eastern semifinal 1

The Rochester Rhinos advanced 3–0 on aggregate.

Eastern semifinal 2

Toronto Lynx advanced 2–0 on aggregate.

Western semifinal 1

The Minnesota Thunder advanced 4–3 on aggregate.

Western semifinal 2

Milwaukee Rampage advanced 4–2 on aggregate.

Conference finals

Eastern Conference

Western Conference

Final

Points leaders

Honors
 MVP:  Digital Takawira
 Goals Leaders (tied): Paul Conway, Greg Howes, Johnny Menyongar
 Goalkeeper of the Year:  Scott Vallow
 Defender of the Year:  Scott Cannon
 Rookie of the Year: Greg Howes
 Coach of the Year: Neil Megson
 First Team All A-League
Goalkeeper: Scott Vallow
Defenders: Chris Fox, Craig Demmin, Scott Cannon, Scott Schweitzer
Midfielders: Brian Loftin, Yari Allnutt, Stoian Mladenov
Forwards: Paul Conway, Darren Sawatzky, Digital Takawira
 Second Team All A-League
Goalkeeper: Theo Zagar
Defenders: Gilbert Jean-Baptiste, Adrian Serioux, David Banks, Rick Titus
Midfielders: Lenin Steenkamp, Gerry Lucey, Martin Nash
Forwards: Dwayne DeRosario, Johnny Menyongar, Greg Howes

External links
 The Year in American Soccer - 2000
 A-League playoff results

2
2000 in Canadian soccer
2000